Mitkaloto Peak is the rocky, partly ice-free peak rising to 1113 m on Eurydice Peninsula, Danco Coast in Graham Land, Antarctica next north of Kapisturia Cove and north-northwest of the terminus of Bozhinov Glacier on the east coast of Charlotte Bay.

The feature is named after the Bulgarian enlightener and revolutionary Matey Preobrazhenski (1828–1875), known as "Mitkaloto".

Location

British mapping in 1978.

Maps
 Antarctic Digital Database (ADD). Scale 1:250000 topographic map of Antarctica. Scientific Committee on Antarctic Research (SCAR). Since 1993, regularly upgraded and updated.

Notes

References
 Mitkaloto Peak. SCAR Composite Antarctic Gazetteer.
 Bulgarian Antarctic Gazetteer. Antarctic Place-names Commission. (details in Bulgarian, basic data in English)

External links
 Mitkaloto Peak. Copernix satellite image

Mountains of Graham Land
Danco Coast
Bulgaria and the Antarctic